Please see external links for images of buttons (front & back) made from the material(s) in question. ("NBS name" refers to labelling used by the National Button Society, USA.)

Natural materials

animal-derived
 bone
 horn
 horsehair
 ivory
 leather
 pearl
 shell (Images of buttons made from all the shell types listed below)
 seashells:

 land shells:
 emerald green snail shell

plant-derived

Rocks and minerals (or predominantly mineral-derived substances)

 bauxite
 catlinite
 cinnabar
 coal
 enamel
 glass
 gypsum (a.k.a. plaster of Paris)
 marcasite
 metals:
 aluminium
brass
pot metal
sterling silver
steel
 whiteware ceramics:
 earthenware
 china

Synthetic materials

plastics

synthetic fibres
 synthetic textiles

See also 
Button collecting
History of technology
Seashells in personal adornment

References

Bibliography 

Buttons